Nedroma is a city in Tlemcen Province, in northwestern Algeria, about   from Tlemcen.  Once the capital of Trara, it was built on the ruins of a Berber town by Abd al-Mu'min the Almohad caliph. It has a great Islamic history, with its Great Mosque of Nedroma once containing the earliest surviving Almoravid minbar. Nedroma became a
UNESCO World Heritage in 2002 for its cultural importance.

History

Once the capital of Trara, it was built on the ruins of a Berber town by Abd al-Mu'min the Almohad caliph, who himself was a native of the neighboring mountains. the town has a great history of Islam. The earliest surviving Almoravid minbar, dated to around A.H. 479, once belonged to the Great Mosque of Nedroma. It is now on display in the Musée Nationale des Antiquités Classiques et Musulmanes in Algiers. In the 1930s Ulama organizations, particularly the Boy Scouts sprang up in Nedroma and other ancient cities of the interior such as Tlemcen and Constantine.

Riots broke out in the town on 15 October 1953, killing one person and injuring several. 26 were convicted.

Nedroma was added to the UNESCO World Heritage Tentative List on December 30, 2002 in the Cultural category.

Geography
The N99 highway passes south-north through the town, connecting it to Maghnia in the south and Ghazaouet on the coast. The W100 road leads to El Houanet in the southwest, and the W38 road leads to Aïn Kebira and Bentalha in the northeast.

Landmarks
Nedroma contains the Great Mosque of Nedroma (Sidi Yahia Mosque) and the Nedroma Hospital in the northern outskirts along the N99. Baked brick is a common building material in the town.

References 

Communes of Tlemcen Province